Ekhlas Uddin Ahmed is a Awami League politician and the former Member of Parliament of Jessore-12.

Career
Ahmed was elected to parliament from Jessore-12 as an Awami League candidate in 1973.

References

Awami League politicians
1932 births
1985 deaths
1st Jatiya Sangsad members